The St. Patrick's Church is a religious building of the Catholic Church which is located in the town of Lookout on the Caribbean island of Montserrat, part of the Lesser Antilles and a British overseas territory.

The temple follows the Roman or Latin rite and depends on the missions of Divine Mercy which is under the jurisdiction of the Diocese of Saint John's - Basseterre (Dioecesis Sancti Ioannis Imatellurana).

In 1997 the church was affected by a volcanic eruption that caused damage to much of the island, and only until 2009 could complete the reconstruction and reopening of the temple.

See also
Roman Catholicism in the United Kingdom
St. Patrick's Church (disambiguation)

References

Roman Catholic churches in Montserrat
Roman Catholic churches completed in 2009